The Saxe-Ernestine House Order was an order of merit instituted by Duke Friedrich of Saxe-Altenburg, Duke Ernst I of Saxe-Coburg-Gotha, and Duke Bernhard II of Saxe-Meiningen on 25 December 1833 as a joint award of the Saxon duchies.

Classes
At first, the Order consisted of five classes: Grand Cross, Commander's Cross with Star in First and Second Classes, and Knight's Cross in First and Second Classes. Awards were reserved for officers.

In 1864, a silver-gilt medal was added but subsequently suppressed in 1918, at the end of World War I. Gold and silver medals were also associated with the Order.

Saxe-Coburg-Gotha revival (2006)
In 2006, the head of the ducal family of Saxe-Coburg-Gotha, Prince Andreas,
created the "Ducal Saxe-Coburg-Gotha House Order" (Herzoglich Sachsen-Coburg-Gotha'sche Hausorden). It is based on the old Ducal Saxe-Ernestine House Order.

Recipients 

 Grand Crosses
 Abbas II of Egypt
 Prince Adalbert of Bavaria (1828–1875)
 Prince Adalbert of Prussia (1884–1948)
 Duke Adam of Württemberg
 Adolphe, Grand Duke of Luxembourg
 Adolphus Frederick VI, Grand Duke of Mecklenburg-Strelitz
 Adolphus Frederick V, Grand Duke of Mecklenburg-Strelitz
 Afonso, Duke of Porto
 Albert I of Belgium
 Albert, 8th Prince of Thurn and Taxis
 Prince Albert of Prussia (1809–1872)
 Prince Albert of Saxe-Altenburg
 Albert of Saxony
 Prince Albert Victor, Duke of Clarence and Avondale
 Albert, Prince Consort
 Prince Albert of Prussia (1837–1906)
 Albert, Prince of Schwarzburg-Rudolstadt
 Prince Ferdinand, Duke of Alençon
 Alexander II of Russia
 Alexander III of Russia
 Alexander of Battenberg
 Prince Alexander of Prussia
 Duke Alexander of Württemberg (1804–1881)
 Duke Alexander of Württemberg (1804–1885)
 Alexis, Landgrave of Hesse-Philippsthal-Barchfeld
 Prince Alfons of Bavaria
 Alfred, Duke of Saxe-Coburg and Gotha
 Alfred, Hereditary Prince of Saxe-Coburg and Gotha
 Alfred, 2nd Prince of Montenuovo
 Infanta Antónia of Portugal
 Aoki Shuzo
 Prince Arnulf of Bavaria
 Prince Arthur, Duke of Connaught and Strathearn
 Prince August Leopold of Saxe-Coburg and Gotha
 Prince August, Duke of Dalarna
 Prince August of Württemberg
 Prince August of Saxe-Coburg and Gotha
 Infante Augusto, Duke of Coimbra
 Abu Bakar of Johor
 Carl Johan Bernadotte
 Bernhard III, Duke of Saxe-Meiningen
 Prince Bernhard of Saxe-Weimar-Eisenach (1792–1862)
 Prince Bertil, Duke of Halland
 Theobald von Bethmann Hollweg
 Herbert von Bismarck
 Otto von Bismarck
 Boris III of Bulgaria
 Bernhard von Bülow
 Carl, 3rd Prince of Leiningen
 Carl XVI Gustaf
 Carlos I of Portugal
 Carol I of Romania
 Charles I of Württemberg
 Charles XV
 Charles Alexander, Grand Duke of Saxe-Weimar-Eisenach
 Charles Augustus, Hereditary Grand Duke of Saxe-Weimar-Eisenach (1844–1894)
 Charles Egon III, Prince of Fürstenberg
 Charles Frederick, Grand Duke of Saxe-Weimar-Eisenach
 Charles Michael, Duke of Mecklenburg
 Prince Charles of Hesse and by Rhine
 Prince Charles of Prussia
 Archduke Charles Stephen of Austria
 Chlodwig, Prince of Hohenlohe-Schillingsfürst
 Chlodwig, Landgrave of Hesse-Philippsthal-Barchfeld
 Christian IX of Denmark
 Prince Christian of Schleswig-Holstein
 Prince Christian Victor of Schleswig-Holstein
 Duke Constantine Petrovich of Oldenburg
 Henri de Brouckère
 Felix de Muelenaere
 Rudolf von Delbrück
 Karl Ludwig d'Elsa
 Edouard d'Huart
 Prince Eduard of Saxe-Altenburg
 Eduard, Duke of Anhalt
 Edward VII
 Prince Edward of Saxe-Weimar
 Ernest II, Duke of Saxe-Coburg and Gotha
 Ernest Augustus, King of Hanover
 Prince Ernest Augustus, 3rd Duke of Cumberland and Teviotdale
 Ernest Louis, Grand Duke of Hesse
 Ernst I, Duke of Saxe-Altenburg
 Ernst Gunther, Duke of Schleswig-Holstein
 Ernst II, Duke of Saxe-Altenburg
 Ernst Leopold, 4th Prince of Leiningen
 Ernst, Prince of Saxe-Meiningen
 Archduke Eugen of Austria
 Ferdinand I of Austria
 Ferdinand I of Bulgaria
 Ferdinand II of Portugal
 Prince Ferdinand of Saxe-Coburg and Gotha
 Francis V, Duke of Modena
 François d'Orléans, Prince of Joinville
 Archduke Franz Ferdinand of Austria
 Franz Joseph I of Austria
 Archduke Franz Karl of Austria
 Prince Franz of Bavaria
 Archduke Franz Salvator of Austria
 Frederick II, Grand Duke of Baden
 Frederick VIII of Denmark
 Frederick VIII, Duke of Schleswig-Holstein
 Frederick Augustus II, Grand Duke of Oldenburg
 Frederick Augustus II of Saxony
 Frederick Augustus III of Saxony
 Frederick Francis II, Grand Duke of Mecklenburg-Schwerin
 Frederick Francis III, Grand Duke of Mecklenburg-Schwerin
 Frederick Francis IV, Grand Duke of Mecklenburg-Schwerin
 Frederick I, Duke of Anhalt
 Frederick I, Grand Duke of Baden
 Frederick III, German Emperor
 Prince Frederick of Hohenzollern-Sigmaringen
 Frederick, Prince of Hohenzollern
 Prince Frederick of Württemberg
 Frederick William III of Prussia
 Frederick William IV of Prussia
 Frederick William, Grand Duke of Mecklenburg-Strelitz
 Friedrich II, Duke of Anhalt
 Friedrich Ferdinand, Duke of Schleswig-Holstein
 Friedrich Günther, Prince of Schwarzburg-Rudolstadt
 Prince Friedrich of Saxe-Meiningen
 Prince Friedrich Karl of Prussia (1828–1885)
 Prince Friedrich Leopold of Prussia
 Archduke Friedrich, Duke of Teschen
 Charles Egon II, Prince of Fürstenberg
 Gaston, Count of Eu
 Georg II, Duke of Saxe-Meiningen
 Georg, Prince of Saxe-Meiningen
 Georg, Duke of Saxe-Altenburg
 Prince Georg of Bavaria
 Georg, Prince of Schaumburg-Lippe
 George I of Greece
 George V of Hanover
 George V
 George Albert, Prince of Schwarzburg-Rudolstadt
 Prince George of Prussia
 George, King of Saxony
 George Victor, Prince of Waldeck and Pyrmont
 Auguste Goffinet
 Colmar Freiherr von der Goltz
 Gustaf V
 Gustaf VI Adolf
 Prince Gustaf Adolf, Duke of Västerbotten
 Prince Gustav of Denmark
 Otto von Habsburg
 Wilhelm von Hahnke
 Jakob von Hartmann
 Heinrich XXII, Prince Reuss of Greiz
 Prince Henry of Prussia (1862–1929)
 Heinrich VII, Prince Reuss of Köstritz
 Henri d'Orléans, Duke of Aumale
 Prince Henry of the Netherlands (1820–1879)
 Prince Hermann of Saxe-Weimar-Eisenach (1825–1901)
 Karl Eberhard Herwarth von Bittenfeld
 Paul von Hindenburg
 Dietrich von Hülsen-Haeseler
 Isma'il Pasha
 Archduke John of Austria
 Prince Johann of Schleswig-Holstein-Sonderburg-Glücksburg
 John of Saxony
 Duke John Albert of Mecklenburg
 Archduke Joseph Karl of Austria
 Joseph, Duke of Saxe-Altenburg
 Prince Julius of Schleswig-Holstein-Sonderburg-Glücksburg
 Prince Karl Anton of Hohenzollern
 Karl Anton, Prince of Hohenzollern
 Archduke Karl Ludwig of Austria
 Prince Karl Theodor of Bavaria
 Karl, Prince of Hohenzollern-Sigmaringen
 Hans von Kirchbach
 Grand Duke Konstantin Konstantinovich of Russia
 Grand Duke Konstantin Nikolayevich of Russia
 Konstantin of Hohenlohe-Schillingsfürst
 Leopold I of Belgium
 Leopold II of Belgium
 Leopold IV, Duke of Anhalt
 Prince Leopold Clement of Saxe-Coburg and Gotha
 Prince Leopold, Duke of Albany
 Leopold, Hereditary Prince of Anhalt
 Prince Leopold of Bavaria
 Leopold, Prince of Hohenzollern
 Prince Leopold of Saxe-Coburg and Gotha
 Charles Liedts
 Eugène, 8th Prince of Ligne
 Louis III, Grand Duke of Hesse
 Louis IV, Grand Duke of Hesse
 Louis II, Grand Duke of Baden
 Prince Louis of Battenberg
 Prince Louis, Duke of Nemours
 Louis Philippe I
 Ludwig I of Bavaria
 Ludwig II of Bavaria
 Prince Ludwig August of Saxe-Coburg and Gotha
 Prince Ludwig Gaston of Saxe-Coburg and Gotha
 Archduke Ludwig Viktor of Austria
 Luís I of Portugal
 Luitpold, Prince Regent of Bavaria
 Edwin Freiherr von Manteuffel
 Marie of Romania
 Duke Maximilian Emanuel in Bavaria
 Prince Maximilian of Baden
 Duke William of Mecklenburg-Schwerin
 Emperor Meiji
 Alexander von Mensdorff-Pouilly, Prince von Dietrichstein zu Nikolsburg
 Emmanuel von Mensdorff-Pouilly
 Klemens von Metternich
 Richard von Metternich
 Grand Duke Michael Alexandrovich of Russia
 Milan I of Serbia
 Helmuth von Moltke the Elder
 Prince Moritz of Saxe-Altenburg
 Napoleon III
 Nicholas I of Russia
 Grand Duke Nicholas Konstantinovich of Russia
 Grand Duke Nicholas Nikolaevich of Russia (1831–1891)
 Jean-Baptiste Nothomb
 Olav V of Norway
 Archduke Otto of Austria (1865–1906)
 Otto of Greece
 Duke Paul Frederick of Mecklenburg
 Paul Frederick, Grand Duke of Mecklenburg-Schwerin
 Pedro II of Brazil
 Pedro V of Portugal
 Prince Pedro Augusto of Saxe-Coburg and Gotha
 Peter II, Grand Duke of Oldenburg
 Duke Peter of Oldenburg
 Nicolae Petrescu-Comnen
 Prince Philipp of Saxe-Coburg and Gotha
 Duke Philipp of Württemberg
 Prince Philippe, Count of Flanders
 Hans von Plessen
 Prince Frederick William of Hesse-Kassel
 Prince Friedrich Wilhelm of Prussia
 Archduke Rainer Ferdinand of Austria
 Charles Rogier
 Prince Rudolf of Liechtenstein
 Rudolf, Crown Prince of Austria
 Rupprecht, Crown Prince of Bavaria
 Prince William of Schaumburg-Lippe
 Count d'Arschot Schoonhoven
 Albert Joseph, 1st Count Goblet d'Alviela.
 Grand Duke Sergei Alexandrovich of Russia
 Sir Francis Seymour, 1st Baronet
 Duke Siegfried August in Bavaria
 Archduke Stephen of Austria (Palatine of Hungary)
 Otto Graf zu Stolberg-Wernigerode
 Alfred von Tirpitz
 Umberto I of Italy
 Prince Valdemar of Denmark
 Sylvain Van de Weyer
 Victor I, Duke of Ratibor
 Victor II, Duke of Ratibor
 Victoria, Princess Royal
 Grand Duke Vladimir Alexandrovich of Russia
 Grand Duke Vladimir Kirillovich of Russia
 Illarion Vorontsov-Dashkov
 Alfred von Waldersee
 Wilhelm II, German Emperor
 Prince Wilhelm of Prussia (1783–1851)
 Prince Wilhelm of Saxe-Weimar-Eisenach
 William I, German Emperor
 William II, Elector of Hesse
 William II of Württemberg
 William III of the Netherlands
 William Ernest, Grand Duke of Saxe-Weimar-Eisenach
 Prince William of Baden (1829–1897)
 Prince William of Hesse-Philippsthal-Barchfeld
 Duke William of Württemberg
 William, Duke of Brunswick
 William, Prince of Hohenzollern
 William, Prince of Wied
 Woldemar, Prince of Lippe
 Friedrich Graf von Wrangel
 Duke Eugen of Württemberg (1846–1877)
 Ferdinand von Zeppelin
 Grand Masters
 Alfred, Duke of Saxe-Coburg and Gotha
 Bernhard II, Duke of Saxe-Meiningen
 Bernhard III, Duke of Saxe-Meiningen
 Charles Edward, Duke of Saxe-Coburg and Gotha
 Ernest I, Duke of Saxe-Coburg and Gotha
 Ernest II, Duke of Saxe-Coburg and Gotha
 Ernst I, Duke of Saxe-Altenburg
 Ernst II, Duke of Saxe-Altenburg
 Frederick, Duke of Saxe-Altenburg
 Georg II, Duke of Saxe-Meiningen
 Georg, Duke of Saxe-Altenburg
 Joseph, Duke of Saxe-Altenburg
 Commanders, 1st Class
 Martin Chales de Beaulieu
 Franz Breithaupt
 Fritz von Loßberg
 Karl von Plettenberg
 Hans von Seeckt
 Julius von Verdy du Vernois
 Commanders, 2nd  Class
 Franz Breithaupt
 Åge Lundström
 Knights, 1st Class
 Oswald Boelcke
 Friedrich Wilhelm von Lindeiner-Wildau
 Curt von Morgen
 Walther Reinhardt
 Manfred von Richthofen
 Knights, 2nd Class
 Ernst Freiherr von Althaus
 Charles Baugniet
 Gaston Errembault de Dudzeele (died 1888)
 Carl Friedrich von Pückler-Burghauss
 Unclassified
 Princess Augusta of Saxe-Meiningen
 Leonhard Kaupisch
 Julius Kühn
 Emil Uzelac
 Princess Victoria Melita of Saxe-Coburg and Gotha
 Nikola Zhekov

References

External links 
 
 House Orders - Website of the Ducal House of Saxe-Coburg and Gotha (in German)

Orders, decorations, and medals of the Ernestine duchies